Mnesampela lenaea, the rippled gum moth, is a moth of the family Geometridae first described by Edward Meyrick in 1892. It is found in Australia.

References

Nacophorini